

Pete's Tavern, located at 129 East 18th Street on the corner of Irving Place in the Gramercy Park neighborhood of Manhattan, New York City, is a pub food restaurant and one of several drinking establishments each claiming to be the oldest continuously operated tavern in the city.

History

The building that houses Pete's was built in 1829, and was originally the Portman Hotel; liquor may have been sold there as early as 1851 or 1852 – when it was a "grocery & grog" store – and the first official drinking establishment founded by 1864. It was bought in 1899 by Tom and John Healy, and became Healy's. During prohibition, when selling alcohol was illegal, the bar continued to operate disguised as a flower shop.

The writer O. Henry lived down the street at 55 Irving Place from 1903 to 1907, and Healy's appears in his short story "The Lost Blend" under the name "Kenealy's". Local legend also has it that he wrote his well-known story "The Gift of the Magi" in Healy's second booth from the front, but this appears to be apocryphal.

The present name dates to the purchase of the establishment by Peter Belles in 1926.

Although the tavern claims to be "an official historical landmark", it is neither a designated New York City landmark nor is it on the National Register of Historic Places.  It does, however, lie within the Gramercy Park Historic District designated by the New York City Landmarks Preservation Commission in 1966.

In popular culture
Pete's Tavern has appeared in numerous films and television programs, including Seinfeld, Ragtime, Endless Love, Law & Order, Nurse Jackie, Spin City, Sex and the City, and The Blacklist.  It has also been used as a location for television commercials and print advertisements.

See also
 List of the oldest restaurants in the United States
 List of restaurants in New York City

References

External links

Official website

Drinking establishments in Manhattan
Gramercy Park
Restaurants in Manhattan